Champat Rai is an Indian politician, Leader and Vice President of Vishva Hindu Parishad, and currently serving as the General Secretary of Shri Ram Janmabhoomi Teerth Kshetra.

References 

Year of birth missing (living people)
Living people
Vishva Hindu Parishad
Ayodhya dispute
Hindu nationalists
Vishva Hindu Parishad members
Indian political people